A photo mill is a modeling agency scam. The scamming agency, rather than allowing models to submit photos from their own photographers, requires models to pay for photos taken by a photographer employed by the agency. Models are often charged outrageous prices for these photos and encouraged to buy more than they actually need.  After the money is collected, the agency rarely finds work for the models.

See also
 Modeling agency

External links 
 Ways to Discover a Modeling Scam

Modeling (profession)